Troy James Cooley (born 9 December 1965) is a former first-class cricketer who played for Tasmania, and was bowling coach for the England cricket team for several years before returning to Australia in 2006.

Career
Born in Launceston, Tasmania, Cooley played 33 first-class games and three one-day games for the Australian state. With the bat he scored 291 runs in first-class cricket at an average of 9.38 with a top score of 32 not out. In one-day domestic cricket with the bat he never had to bat in his 3 matches that he played. With the ball in first-class cricket he took 54 wickets at 61.35 with a best of 4/41 and in one-day domestic cricket with the ball he took 4 wickets at an average of 21.25 with a best of 
2/16.

Coaching
He took up coaching for the Tasmanian Tigers as at one time or another an assistant coach to the state team, the state's junior development officer, fitness advisor, pace bowling coach and under-17 coach.

As the bowling coach for the England national team, he was considered instrumental in helping players such as Andrew Flintoff, Steve Harmison, Simon Jones, Matthew Hoggard and James Anderson amongst others improve their bowling, though the form of the latter after Cooley's intervention suggests otherwise.

Following the lack of an offer from the ECB, he left his post at the end of his contract in December 2005, and in May 2006 became the bowling coach for the Australian national team. The England Cricket Board (ECB) was criticised for letting him move as he was seen as a key figure in England's 2005 Ashes success. Following England's loss of the first test in The Ashes in Australia in 2006, former England captain Tony Greig commented that England missed Cooley. After England had lost the fourth test, Cooley commented that the English side has lost its "intensity", and was surprised at the team bringing back injured players like Ashley Giles who had little recent form.

At the end of the 2010–11 Ashes series, Cooley will become head coach of Cricket Australia's Centre of Excellence in Brisbane.

Cooley left Cricket Australia in 2021 and joined the BCCI where he is responsible for Coaching and setting up the National Pace Bowling Program.

Family
Spouse - Melissa Cooley,
Children - Grace Cooley and Edward Cooley

References

External links
 

1965 births
Living people
Australian cricket coaches
Australian cricketers
Coaches of the England cricket team
Cricketers from Launceston, Tasmania
Tasmania cricketers